South Korea (IOC designation:Korea) participated in the 1999 Asian Winter Games held in Yongpyong, Chuncheon, and Gangneung in Gangwon, South Korea from January 30, 1999 to February 6, 1999.

Medal summary

Medal table

Medalists

Gold
Alpine skiing
 Men's Slalom - Hur Seung-wook
 Men's Super Giant Slalom - Hur Seung-wook
 Women's Super Giant Slalom - Yoo Hye-min

Short track speed skating
 Men's 500 m - Lee Jun-hwan
 Men's 1500 m - Kim Dong-sung
 Men's 3000 m - Kim Dong-sung
 Women's 1500 m - Kim Yoon-mi
 Women's 3000 m - Kim Moon-jung
 Women's 3000 m Relay - Choi Min-kyung, Kim Yoon-mi, An Sang-mi, Kim Moon-jung

Speed skating
 Men's 1000 m - Choi Jae-bong
 Men's 1500 m - Choi Jae-bong

Silver
Alpine skiing
 Men's Giant Slalom - Hur Seung-wook
 Women's Giant Slalom - Yoo Hye-min
 Women's Super Giant Slalom - Yang Woo-young

Short track speed skating
 Men's 1000 m - Kim Dong-sung
 Men's 3000 m - Lee Jun-hwan
 Women's 500 m - Choi Min-kyung

Speed skating
 Men's 500 m - Jaegal Sung-yeol
 Men's 1000 m - Lee Kyu-hyuk
 Men's 1500 m - Chun Joo-hyun
 Men's 5000 m - Moon Jun

Bronze
Alpine skiing
 Men's Slalom - Choi Moon-sung
 Men's Giant Slalom - Lee Ki-hyun
 Men's Super Giant Slalom - Choi Moon-sung

Biathlon
 Men's 4 x 7.5 km Relay - Son Hae-kwon, Shin Byung-kook, Choi Neung-chul, Jeon Jae-won
 Women's 4 x 7.5 km Relay - Kim Ja-youn, Kim Mi-young, Yoo Jea-sun, Choi Mi-jung

Figure skating
 Ice Dancing - Yang Tae-hwa / Lee Chuen-gun

Cross-country skiing
 Men's 4 x 10 km Relay - Park Byeong-ju, Park Byung-chul, Shin Doo-sun, Ahn Jin-soo

Short track speed skating
 Men's 1500 m - Lee Jun-hwan
 Men's 5000 m Relay - Kim Dong-sung, Lee Jun-hwan, Lee Ho-eung, Kim Seon-tae
 Women's 1000 m - Kim Yoon-mi
 Women's 3000 m - Choi Min-kyung

Speed skating
 Men's 1000 m - Chun Joo-hyun
 Men's 10000 m - Moon Jun

References

Nations at the 1999 Asian Winter Games
Asian Winter Games
South Korea at the Asian Winter Games